Abacus seeds ( or abacus beads is a Hakka Chinese dish consisting of dimpled, disc-shaped dumplings made with taro and tapioca flour. The dumplings are boiled then stir-fried with minced pork, shiitake or wood ear mushrooms, dried shrimp, dried cuttlefish and firm bean curd.

Due to its association with the abacus and counting money, the dish is eaten during festivals such as Chinese New Year to signify wealth and prosperity. The dumplings' round shape is also said to represent reunion and good health.

It can be found in parts of China, Taiwan, Malaysia and Singapore, and in cities with a large Hakka population.

History
Abacus seeds date back to the Song dynasty. It was prepared by Hakka women for the men of the village to carry with them when they ventured out to look for work. The dish was both a food and also a symbolic wish that the men would find success and earn more money to count with an abacus.

Gallery

See also

 List of dumplings

References 

Chinese cuisine
Malaysian cuisine
Singaporean cuisine
Hakka cuisine
Hakka culture in Singapore